Toll-like receptor 4 is a protein that in humans is encoded by the TLR4 gene. TLR4 is a transmembrane protein, member of the toll-like receptor family, which belongs to the pattern recognition receptor (PRR) family. Its activation leads to an intracellular signaling pathway NF-κB and inflammatory cytokine production which is responsible for activating the innate immune system.

TLR4 expressing cells are myeloid (erythrocytes, granulocytes, macrophages) rather than lymphoid (T-cells, B-cells, NK cells). Most myeloid cells also express high levels of CD14, which facilitates activation of TLR4 by LPS.

It is most well known for recognizing lipopolysaccharide (LPS), a component present in many Gram-negative bacteria (e.g. Neisseria spp.) and selected Gram-positive bacteria. Its ligands also include several viral proteins, polysaccharide, and a variety of endogenous proteins such as low-density lipoprotein, beta-defensins, and heat shock protein. Palmitic acid and lauric acid are also a TLR4 agonists, and chronic inflammatory responses via cytokine release can result from high dietary intake of these nutrients. However, unsaturated omega-3 and omega-6 fatty acids serve as TLR4 antagonists and can negate the inflammation caused by a high-fat diet.

TLR4 has also been designated as CD284 (cluster of differentiation 284). The molecular weight of TLR4 is approximately 95 kDa.

Function 

TLR4 is a member of the toll-like receptor (TLR) family, which plays a fundamental role in pathogen recognition and activation of innate immunity. They recognize pathogen-associated molecular patterns (PAMPs) that are expressed on infectious agents, and mediate the production of cytokines necessary for the development of effective immunity. TLRs are highly conserved from plants to Drosophila to humans and share structural and functional similarities.

The various TLRs exhibit different patterns of expression. This receptor is most abundantly expressed in placenta, and in myelomonocytic subpopulation of the leukocytes.

It cooperates with LY96 (also referred as MD-2) and CD14 to mediate in signal transduction events induced by lipopolysaccharide (LPS)  found in most gram-negative bacteria. Mutations in this gene have been associated with differences in LPS responsiveness.

TLR4 signaling responds to signals by forming a complex using an extracellular leucine-rich repeat domain (LRR) and an intracellular toll/interleukin-1 receptor (TIR) domain. LPS stimulation induces a series of interactions with several accessory proteins which form the TLR4 complex on the cell surface. LPS recognition is initiated by an LPS binding to an LBP protein. This LPS-LBP complex transfers the LPS to CD14. CD14 is a glycosylphosphatidylinositol-anchored membrane protein that binds the LPS-LBP complex and facilitates the transfer of LPS to MD-2 protein, which is associated with the extracellular domain of TLR4. LPS binding promotes the dimerization of TLR4/MD-2. The conformational changes of the TLR4 induce the recruitment of intracellular adaptor proteins containing the TIR domain which is necessary to activate the downstream signaling pathway.

Several transcript variants of this gene have been found, but the protein-coding potential of most of them is uncertain.

Most of the reported effects of TLR4 signaling in tumors are pro-carcinogenic mainly due to contributions of proinflammatory cytokine signaling (whose expression is driven by TLR-mediated signals) to tumor-promoting microenvironment.

Signaling 

Upon LPS recognition, conformational changes in the TLR4 receptors result in recruitment of intracellular TIR-domains containing adaptor molecules. These adaptors are associated with the TLR4 cluster via homophilic interactions between the TIR domains. There are four adaptor proteins involved in two major intracellular signaling pathways.

MyD88 – dependent pathway 

The MyD88-dependent pathway is regulated by two adaptor-associated proteins: Myeloid Differentiation Primary Response Gene 88 (MyD88) and TIR Domain-Containing Adaptor Protein (TIRAP). TIRAP-MyD88 regulates early NF-κβ activation and production of proinflammatory cytokines, such as IL-12. MyD88 signaling involves the activation of IL-1 Receptor-Associated Kinases (IRAKs) and the adaptor molecules TNF Receptor-Associated Factor 6 (TRAF6). TRAF6 induces the activation of TAK1 (Transforming growth factor-β-Activated Kinase 1) that leads to the activation of MAPK cascades (Mitogen-Activated Protein Kinase) and IKK (IκB Kinase). IKKs' signaling pathway leads to the induction of the transcription factor NF-κB, while activation of MAPK cascades lead to the activation of another transcription factor AP-1. Both of them have a role in the expression of proinflammatory cytokines. The activation of NF-κB via TAK-1 is complex, and it starts by the assembly of a protein complex called the signalosome, which is made of a scaffolding protein, called NEMO. The protein complex is made from two different κB kinases, called IKKα and IKKβ. This causes the addition of a small regulatory protein to the signalosome called ubiquitin, that acts to initiate the release of the NF-κB protein, which coordinates translocation in the nucleus of cytokines.

MyD88 – independent pathway 

This TRIF-dependent pathway involves the recruitment of the adaptor proteins TIR-domain-containing adaptor inducing interferon-β (TRIF) and TRIF-related Adaptor Molecule (TRAM). TRAM-TRIF signals activate the transcription factor Interferon Regulatory Factor-3 (IRF3) via TRAF3. IRF3 activation induces the production of type 1 interferons.

SARM – TRIF-mediated pathway 

A fifth TIR-domain-containing adaptor protein called Sterile α and HEAT (Armadillo motif) (SARM) is a TLR4 signaling pathway inhibitor. SARM activation by LPS-binding inhibits -TRIF-mediated pathways but does not inhibit MyD88-mediated pathways. This mechanism prevents an excessive activation in response to LPS which may lead to inflammation-induced damage such as sepsis.

Evolutionary history 
TLR4 originated when TLR2 and TLR4 diverged about 500 million years ago near the beginning of vertebrate evolution. Sequence alignments of human and great ape TLR4 exons have demonstrated that not much evolution has occurred in human TLR4 since our divergence from our last common ancestor with chimpanzees; human and chimp TLR4 exons only differ by three substitutions while humans and baboons are 93.5% similar in the extracellular domain. Notably, humans possess a greater number of early stop codons in TLR4 than great apes; in a study of 158 humans worldwide, 0.6% had a nonsense mutation. This suggests that there are weaker evolutionary pressures on the human TLR4 than on our primate relatives. The distribution of human TLR4 polymorphisms matches the out-of-Africa migration, and it is likely that the polymorphisms were generated in Africa before migration to other continents.

Interactions 
TLR4 has been shown to interact with:
 Lymphocyte antigen 96,
 Myd88, and 
 TOLLIP.
 Nickel,

Intracellular trafficking of TLR4 is dependent on the GTPase Rab-11a, and knock down of Rab-11a results in hampered TLR4 recruitment to E. coli-containing phagosomes and subsequent reduced signal transduction through the MyD88-independent pathway.

Clinical significance

Various single nucleotide polymorphisms (SNPs) of the TLR4 in humans have been identified and for some of them an association with increased susceptibility to Gram-negative bacterial infections   or faster progression and a more severe course of sepsis in critically ill patients was reported.

In sepsis 
TLR4 can be activated by binding to the lipid A portion of lipopolysaccharide found in Gram-negative bacteria.  Exaggerated and uncontrolled inflammation triggered by TLR4 during infection can lead to sepsis and septic shock. Infections with Gram-negative bacteria such as Escherichia coli and Pseudomonas aeruginosa are the prevailing causes of severe sepsis in humans.

In insulin resistance 

Fetuin-A facilitates the binding of lipids to receptors, thereby contributing to insulin resistance.

In cancer progression 

TLR4 expression can be detected on many tumor cells and cell lines. TLR4 is capable of activating MAPK and NF-κB pathways, implicating possible direct role of cell-autonomous TLR4 signaling in regulation of carcinogenesis, in particular, through increased proliferation of tumor cells, apoptosis inhibition and metastasis. TLR4 signaling may also contribute to resistance to paclitaxel chemotherapy in ovary cancer and siRNA therapy in prostate cancer. 63% of breast cancer patients were reported to express TLR4 on tumor cells and the level of expression inversely correlated with the survival. Additionally, low MyD88 expression correlated with decreased metastasis to the lung and decreased CCL2 and CCL5 expression. TLR4 expression levels were the highest among TLRs in human breast cancer cell line MDA-MB-231 and TLR4 knockdown resulted in decreased proliferation and decreased IL-6 and IL-8 levels. On the other hand, TLR4 signaling in immune and inflammatory cells of tumor microenvironment may lead to production of proinflammatory cytokines (TNF, IL-1β, IL-6, IL-18, etc.), immunosuppressive cytokines (IL-10, TGF-β, etc.) and angiogenic mediators (VEGF, EGF, TGF-β, etc.).

These activities may result in further polarization of tumor-associated macrophages, conversion of fibroblasts into tumor-promoting cancer-associated fibroblasts, conversion of dendritic cells into tumor-associated DCs and activation of pro-tumorigenic functions of immature myeloid cells - Myeloid-derived Suppressor Cells (MDSC). TLR signaling has been linked to accumulation and function of MDSC at the site of tumor and it also allows mesenchymal stromal cells to counter NK cell-mediated anti-tumor immunity. In HepG2 hepatoblastoma cells LPS increased TLR4 levels, cell proliferation and resistance to chemotherapy, and these phenomena could be reversed by TLR4 gene knockdown. Similarly, LPS stimulation of human liver cancer cell line H7402 resulted in TLR4 upregulation, NF-κB activation, TNF, IL-6 and IL-8 production and increased proliferation that could be reversed by signal transducer
and STAT3 inhibition. Besides the successful usage of Bacillus Calmette–Guérin in the therapy of bladder cancer there are reports on the treatment of oral squamous cell carcinoma, gastric cancer and cervical cancer with lyophilized streptococcal preparation OK-432 and utilization of TLR4/TLR2 ligands – derivatives of muramyl dipeptide.

TLR4 stimulates B-cell responsiveness to Pokeweed mitogen for proliferation which can play a role in inhibiting tumor development.

In pregnancy 
Activation of TLR4 in intrauterine infections leads to deregulation of prostaglandin synthesis, leading to uterine smooth muscle contraction.

Asp299Gly polymorphism 

Classically, TLR4 is said to be the receptor for LPS, however TLR4 has also been shown to be activated by other kinds of lipids. Plasmodium falciparum, a parasite known to cause the most common and serious form of malaria that is seen primarily in Africa, produces glycosylphosphatidylinositol, which can activate TLR4. Two SNPs in TLR4 are co-expressed with high penetrance in African populations (i.e. TLR-4-Asp299Gly and TLR-4-Thr399Ile). These Polymorphisms are associated with an increase in TLR4-Mediated IL-10 production—an immunomodulator—and a decrease in proinflammatory cytokines. The TLR-4-Asp299Gly point mutation is strongly correlated with an increased infection rate with Plasmodium falciparum. It appears that the mutation prevents TLR4 from acting as vigorously against, at least some plasmodial infections. The malaria infection rate and associated morbidity are higher in TLR-4-Asp299Gly group, but mortality appears to be decreased. This may indicate that at least part of the pathogenesis of malaria takes advantage of cytokine production. By reducing the cytokine production via the TLR4 mutation, the infection rate may increase, but the number of deaths due to the infection seem to decrease.

In addition, TLR4-D299G has been associated with aggressive colorectal cancer in humans. It has been shown that human colon adenocarcinomas from patients with TLR4-D299G were more frequently of an advanced stage with metastasis than those with wild-type TLR4.  The same study demonstrated functionally that intestinal epithelial cells (Caco-2) expressing TLR4-D299G underwent epithelial-mesenchymal transition and morphologic changes associated with tumor progression, whereas intestinal epithelial cells expressing wild-type TLR4 did not.

Animal studies 

A link between the TLR4 receptor and binge drinking has been suggested. When genes responsible for the expression of TLR4 and GABA receptors are manipulated in rodents that had been bred and trained to drink excessively, the animals showed a "profound reduction" in drinking behaviours. Additionally, it has been shown that ethanol, even in the absence of LPS, can activate TLR4 signaling pathways.

High levels of TLR4 molecules and M2 tumor-associated macrophages are associated with increased susceptibility to cancer growth in mice deprived of sleep.  Mice genetically modified so that they could not produce TLR4 molecules showed normal cancer growth.

Drugs targeting TLR4 

Toll-like receptor 4 has been shown to be important for the long-term side-effects of opioid analgesic drugs. Various μ-opioid receptor ligands have been tested and found to also possess action as agonists or antagonists of TLR4, with opioid agonists such as (+)-morphine being TLR4 agonists, while opioid antagonists such as naloxone were found to be TLR4 antagonists. Activation of TLR4 leads to downstream release of inflammatory modulators including TNF-α and Interleukin-1, and constant low-level release of these modulators is thought to reduce the efficacy of opioid drug treatment with time, and be involved in both the development of tolerance to opioid analgesic drugs, and in the emergence of side-effects such as hyperalgesia and allodynia that can become a problem following extended use of opioid drugs. Drugs that block the action of TNF-α or IL-1β have been shown to increase the analgesic effects of opioids and reduce the development of tolerance and other side-effects, and this has also been demonstrated with drugs that block TLR4 itself.

The response of TLR4 to opioid drugs has been found to be enantiomer-independent, so the "unnatural" enantiomers of opioid drugs such as morphine and naloxone, which lack affinity for opioid receptors, still produce the same activity at TLR4 as their "normal" enantiomers. This means that the unnatural enantiomers of opioid antagonists, such as (+)-naloxone, can be used to block the TLR4 activity of opioid analgesic drugs, while leaving the μ-opioid receptor mediated analgesic activity unaffected. This may also be the mechanism behind the beneficial effect of ultra-low dose naltrexone on opioid analgesia.

Morphine causes inflammation by binding to the protein lymphocyte antigen 96, which, in turn, causes the protein to bind to Toll-like receptor 4 (TLR4). The morphine-induced TLR4 activation attenuates pain suppression by opioids and enhances the development of opioid tolerance and addiction, drug abuse, and other negative side effects such as respiratory depression and hyperalgesia. Drug candidates that target TLR4 may improve opioid-based pain management therapies.

Agonists 

 Buprenorphine
 Carbamazepine
 Ethanol
 Fentanyl
 Levorphanol
 Lipopolysaccharides (LPS)
 Methadone
 Morphine
 Oxcarbazepine
 Oxycodone
 Pethidine

 Glucuronoxylomannan from Cryptococcus
 Morphine-3-glucuronide (inactive at opioid receptors, so selective for TLR4 activation)
 Tapentadol (combined full μ-opioid receptor agonist and norepinephrine reuptake inhibitor)
 "Unnatural" isomers such as (+)-morphine activate TLR4 but lack opioid receptor activity, although (+)-morphine also shows activity as a sigma receptor agonist.

Antagonists 

 The lipid A analog eritoran acts as a TLR4 antagonist. , it was being developed as a drug against severe sepsis. However, in 2013, a news story said the results against sepsis were somewhat disappointing and that it was better used to treat certain cases of severe influenza. Although it does not treat the virus itself, it could be used against the massive immune reaction called cytokine storm which often occurs later in the infection and is a major cause of mortality from severe influenza.

 Amitriptyline
 Cyclobenzaprine
 Ketotifen
 Imipramine
 Mianserin
 Ibudilast
 Pinocembrin
 Resatorvid
 M62812
 Naloxone
 (+)-Naloxone ("unnatural" isomer, lacks opioid receptor affinity so selective for TLR4 inhibition)
 Naltrexone
 (+)-Naltrexone
 LPS-RS
 Propentofylline
 Pentoxifylline (and downregulate TLR4 expression)
 Tapentadol (mixed agonist/antagonist)
 TLR4-IN-C34
 Palmitoylethanolamide

References

External links 
 
 

Clusters of differentiation
4
LRR proteins